Atari may refer to the following people
Given name
 Atari Bigby (born 1981), American football player

Surname
Ahmed Atari (born 1994), Qatari swimmer
Gali Atari (born 1953), Israeli singer and actress, sister of Yona and Shosh
Kousuke Atari (born 1980), Japanese singer
Shosh Atari (1949–2008), Israeli radio personality, sister of Gali and Yona
Yona Atari (1933–2019), Israeli singer and actress, sister of Shosh and Gali